Dmytro Volodymyrovych Lukanov (born 2 March 1995) is a professional Ukrainian football striker who currently plays for FC Zorya Luhansk in the Ukrainian Premier League.

Career
He is a product of the FC Atlet Kyiv School System. His first trainer was Dmytro Murashenko.

He made his debut for FC Metalist in the match against FC Shakhtar Donetsk on 18 April 2015 in the Ukrainian Premier League.

References

External links
Statistics at FFU website (Ukr)

1995 births
Living people
Ukrainian footballers
FC Zorya Luhansk players
Ukrainian Premier League players

Association football forwards
Footballers from Kyiv